Emily Collins (born 16 September 1990) is a New Zealand former professional racing cyclist. She competed in the 2013 UCI women's road race in Florence.

Major results

2011
 5th Road race, National Road Championships
 5th Overall Women's Tour of New Zealand
2012
 5th Overall Belgium Tour
2013
 National Road Championships
1st  Criterium
10th Road race
 1st Omloop van het Hageland
 10th Le Samyn des Dames
 10th Sparkassen Giro Bochum
2014
 4th Road race, National Road Championships
 4th Diamond Tour
 9th Road race, Oceania Road Championships
2015
 3rd Overall Armed Forces Association Cycling Classic
 4th Road race, National Road Championships
 5th Grand Prix Cycliste de Gatineau
 10th Overall Bay Classic Series
2016
 5th Road race, National Road Championships
 9th Overall Santos Women's Tour
 9th Overall Joe Martin Stage Race

References

External links

1990 births
Living people
New Zealand female cyclists
Cyclists from Auckland
Cyclists at the 2014 Commonwealth Games
Commonwealth Games competitors for New Zealand
21st-century New Zealand women